The Tourette was a microcar by Carr Brothers (later Progress Supreme Co Ltd) of Purley, London, England between 1956 and 1958.

It had a three-wheeled, rounded body that was available either in alloy on an ash frame, or in fibreglass. The car was powered by a two-stroke 197 cc Villiers engine driving through a four-speed gearbox with optional Dynastart reverse. Top speed was claimed to be . The single rear wheel was mounted in a pivotal fork. Front-wheel movement was controlled by hydraulically damped spring units. Final drive was by chain. A single bench seat provided accommodation for two adults and a child with some luggage space behind the seat.

In 1958, the purchase price (including purchase tax), was £386 10s 5d (£386.52). Only 26 are believed to have been produced.

See also
 List of car manufacturers of the United Kingdom

References

External links 
Photograph of the Tourette (white car in top photograph) in the Hammond Collection at Motor Snippets

Microcars
Defunct motor vehicle manufacturers of England
Three-wheeled motor vehicles
Motor vehicle manufacturers based in London
Cars introduced in 1956